Champoussin is a village in the Swiss Alps, located in the canton of Valais. The village is situated in the western part of the canton, near Champéry, in the municipality of Val-d'Illiez.

Champoussin lies at a height of 1,597 metres above sea level, on the eastern flanks of Pointe de l'Au. In winter it is part of the international ski area of Portes du Soleil.

References
Swisstopo topographic maps

External links
Official website

Villages in Valais
Ski areas and resorts in Switzerland